is a railway station on the Asa Line in Yasuda, Aki District, Kōchi Prefecture, Japan. It is operated by the third-sector Tosa Kuroshio Railway with the station number "GN24".

Lines

Layout
The station consists of a side platform serving a single track on an embankment. There is no station building but a shelter with both an enclosed and an open compartment has been set up on the platform. A separate waiting room, toilet and bicycle shed have been set in the station forecourt where parking for cars is available. Access to the platform is by means of a short flight of steps or a ramp.

Adjacent stations

Station mascot
Each station on the Asa Line features a cartoon mascot character designed by Takashi Yanase, a local cartoonist from Kōchi Prefecture. The mascot for Tōnohama Station is a figure dressed in the white pilgrim's garments and straw hat used by those on the Shikoku Pilgrimage. Named , the character is chosen because the station is located near the Kōnomine-ji, the 27th Buddhist temple on the pilgrim trail and many pilgrims use the station throughout the year.

History

Passenger statistics
In fiscal 2011, the station was used by an average of 49 passengers daily.

See also 
List of railway stations in Japan

References

Railway stations in Kōchi Prefecture
Railway stations in Japan opened in 2002